Rajko "Billy" Boljevic is a retired Yugoslavian professional football (soccer) forward.  He was the 1981 American Soccer League Most Valuable Player and league leading scorer.

In 1981, he signed with the New York Eagles of the American Soccer League.  He led the league in both goals and points was he was named the league MVP.  In November 1981, he signed with the New Jersey Rockets of the Major Indoor Soccer League.  He then played for the Detroit Express for the 1982 and 1983 seasons.  In 1984, he was with the Dallas Americans in the United Soccer League.

Yearly Awards
ASL MVP: 1981

ASL Leading Goalscorer: 1981 (25 Goals)

ASL Leading Points Scorer: 1981 (59 Points)

References

External links
 New Jersey Rockets stats

1952 births
People from Crvenka
American Soccer League (1933–1983) players
Dallas Americans players
Detroit Express (1981–1983) players
Major Indoor Soccer League (1978–1992) players
New Jersey Rockets (MISL) players
New York Eagles players
Yugoslav footballers
Yugoslav expatriate footballers
Expatriate soccer players in the United States
Yugoslav expatriate sportspeople in the United States
Serbian footballers
United Soccer League (1984–85) players
Living people
Association football forwards